Valentyn Krukovets (born 29 December, January 1978) is a Ukrainian former professional footballer. He spend most of his career to Desna Chernihiv.

Honours
Desna Chernihiv
 Ukrainian Second League: 2005–06

Sokil Zolochiv
 Ukrainian Second League: 2001–02

Individual
 Desna Chernihiv Player of the Year: 2007

References

External links 
Profile on website 

1978 births
Living people
Ukrainian footballers
FC Khutrovyk Tysmenytsia players
FC Desna Chernihiv players
FC Volyn Lutsk players
FC Sokil Zolochiv players
Ukrainian football managers
Association football midfielders
Association football forwards